Kaitlyn Ashley Maher (born January 10, 2004) is an American teen singer and actress known for being the Youngest Top 10 Finalist on America's Got Talent and for her roles in films such as The Search for Santa Paws, Santa Paws 2, Free Birds, and the PupStar series; as well as television shows such as FOX's The Goodwin Games and PBS' Mack and Moxy. She serves as the first-ever youth ambassador for the global nonprofit Compassion International and is a national debate champion, singer/songwriter, and global advocate.

In 2008, at the age of 4, Maher appeared on the third season of America's Got Talent and for her audition sang "Somewhere Out There". She reached the top 10 of AGT season 3, and was the youngest person to ever reach that level. Maher has since appeared live at The Great Kids Expo in Chantilly, Virginia, on October 25, 2008, a live broadcast of the 2008 lighting of the National Christmas Tree, on December 4, 2008, attended by President George W. Bush and over 7,000 guests, and the 2009 Cherry Blossom Festival on April 11, 2009, attended by First Lady Michelle Obama. On October 3, 2009, Maher was the opening act of The Addi and Cassi Hempel Fund benefit. Maher has appeared in a Harris Teeter commercial airing during December 2008. She was also selected by Compassion International as its first ever Child Ambassador, visited children in El Salvador with Compassion, got to meet her sponsored child, and shot a music video to her title song "You Were Meant to Be."

Maher signed a recording deal late in 2009 with Indie Extreme for the release of her debut album You Were Meant To Be. The album was released December 15, 2009. Maher appeared in the Disney movie Santa Buddies as the voice for the character Tiny, which was released on November 24, 2009. Maher played the orphan Quinn in The Search for Santa Paws. She played Sarah Reynolds in Santa Paws 2: The Santa Pups. In 2013, Maher starred alongside T.J. Miller, Scott Foley, Becki Newton, and Beau Bridges as Piper Goodwin in the FOX TV series The Goodwin Games. She acted as the President's Daughter in Free Birds, alongside co-stars Amy Poehler, Owen Wilson, Woody Harrelson, and George Takei. From 2016 to 2019, she played the lead roles of both Tiny and Scrappy in AirBud's four-film PupStar series. She has acted in supporting roles in the Disney movie Treasure Buddies, the PBS TV series Mack and Moxy, the Disney series Disney's World of English, the AirBud film Russell Madness, and subsequent 2020 film series Russell Maniac, among others.

Maher continues to write and produce music across her social media platforms, including her recent self-written inspirational song, "World Without You," which was released in 2020 and has gained tens of thousands of YouTube views. She has performed on behalf of special needs children for the nonprofit organization, Jill's House, for critically ill children at the National Institutes of Health Children's Inn, for wounded warriors at the Walter Reed National Military Medical Center, and for retired soldiers at the Veterans' Affairs Center in Washington, D.C. In addition to touring internationally (including across China, Canada, and Israel), Maher has traveled to Ghana, Honduras, Zambia, Zimbabwe, Madagascar, South Africa, and Malawi to engage in humanitarian outreach alongside local community partners in poverty-stricken areas. When not performing professionally, she is a lead singer in her church band.

Early life and education
Maher was born Kaitlyn Ashley Maher in Novi, Michigan, on January 10, 2004, and raised in Ashburn, Virginia. To accommodate a demanding film and performance schedule, she was homeschooled through the Laurel Springs School up until 9th grade, when she began attending The Potomac School. In high school, Maher competed on the USA Debate Team and captained her school's nationally ranked speech and debate team, placing first in the nation in Extemporaneous Debate at the 2021 National Speech and Debate Tournament. Passionate about public speaking and political advocacy, her writing has been published by The Aspen Institute, a leading global think tank. She currently attends Duke University.

Career

America's Got Talent
Maher began her career on the third season of the American television reality show America's Got Talent, when she reached the top ten. Producers from the show first became aware of her from a video that was uploaded to YouTube. The video had been made after she had been asked to sing at a birthday party for one of her family relations in Canada and the video was later posted because her mother, Alison was pregnant with her second child and they could not travel to the country. Around Maher's fourth birthday, five months after the video had been made, her parents received an e-mail from AGT's Website on NBC.com, asking if their daughter would be able to audition for the show's third season in 2008.

Performances / Results

The Goodwin Games
In 2013, Maher joined the cast of The Goodwin Games in the role of Piper Goodwin, the daughter of Jimmy Goodwin (played by T.J. Miller).

Russell Madness
Maher provided the voice of Grace in Russell Madness, directed by Robert Vince. This film was released on February 21, 2015.

Discography

 You Were Meant to Be (2009, Universal Music: 11 tracks)
 World Without You (2020, Single)

Filmography

References

External links
 Official site
 Official Facebook page

2004 births
Living people
Singers from Virginia
American child singers
American child actresses
America's Got Talent contestants
Singers from Michigan
People from Ashburn, Virginia
American voice actresses
21st-century American actresses
21st-century American women singers
21st-century American singers
Child pop musicians
American performers of Christian music